Nadrlje (Serbian Cyrillic: Надрље) is a village in Central Serbia (Šumadija), in the municipality of Rekovac (Region of Levač), lying at , at the elevation of 520 m. According to the 2002 census, the village had 229 citizens.

External links
 Levac Online
 Article about Nadrlje.

Populated places in Pomoravlje District
Šumadija